Depressaria prospicua is a moth in the family Depressariidae. It was described by Edward Meyrick in 1914. It is found in South Africa.

The wingspan is 19–20 mm. The forewings are whitish ochreous, tinged here and there with brownish, with some scattered blackish specks and with a blackish-grey spot on the base of the costa, its edge marked with a black dot above the middle of the wing, the corresponding dorsal space whitish. The first discal stigma is black, with an additional dot obliquely before and rather above it, both these surrounded with white suffusion. The second discal stigma is white edged with dark fuscous, sometimes with an indistinct white dot before and slightly above it. All these dots are more or less surrounded with ochreous-brown suffusion, sometimes forming a longitudinal streak and there is an undefined angulated subterminal fascia of brownish suffusion. Some dots formed of two or three black specks each are found around the posterior part of the costa and termen. The hindwings are ochreous whitish slightly tinged with grey.

References

Endemic moths of South Africa
Moths described in 1914
Depressaria
Moths of Africa